Babu Lal Tiwari is an Indian politician who is serving as Member of Uttar Pradesh Legislative Council from Allahabad–Jhansi teacher constituency. He is the first person from Jhansi who was elected to the council.

References 

Politicians from Jhansi
Members of the Uttar Pradesh Legislative Council

Year of birth missing (living people)
Living people